Achilli is an Italian surname. Notable people with the surname include:

 Camillo Achilli (1921–1998), Italian footballer
 Giacinto Achilli (1803–1860), Italian discharged priest
 Justin Achilli, writer associated with White Wolf, Inc. American games company 
 Marco Achilli (1948–2009), Italian footballer
 Romain Achilli (born 1993), French footballer

See also 
 Achilles (disambiguation)
 Achille (disambiguation)
 Achillini

Italian-language surnames